Eric Christensen may refer to:
 Eric Christensen (visual effects supervisor)
 Eric J. Christensen, American astronomer

See also
 Erik Christensen (disambiguation)